Sir Darryl Farris (born November 5, 1986), known mononymously as Sir (stylized as SiR), is an American singer from Inglewood, California. He released his debut album Seven Sundays in 2015 on the independent label Fresh Selects, and is currently signed to Top Dawg Entertainment, where he released his second and third studio albums, November and Chasing Summer.

Early life 
Sir Darryl Farris grew up in a musical family with his mother, brothers, and cousin being gospel singers in Inglewood. He earned a degree in recording arts at the Los Angeles Film School and developed his songwriting, arranging, and production skills. His mother was a backup singer for Michael Jackson and Anita Baker, and his uncle Andrew Gouche was a bassist for Prince. He is the younger brother of Grammy award nominated rapper D Smoke.

Musical career

2007–2014: Career beginnings 
In 2007, SiR joined a songwriting group called WoodWorks with his brothers and his cousin Tiffany Gouché, who wrote songs for Jaheim and The Pussycat Dolls. He landed a job engineering for Tyrese Gibson in 2012 while quietly developing his craft as a songwriter. After meeting the songwriting duo Dre & Vidal, he went on to work with Anita Baker. From 2011 through 2015, he co-wrote material for Ginuwine, Jill Scott, and Stevie Wonder. In 2014, he featured on Anderson .Paak's album Venice.

2015–2018: Seven Sundays and signing to Top Dawg Entertainment 
On July 31, 2015, SiR released his debut album, titled Seven Sundays, through the independent record label, Fresh Selects.  The album featured production from Knxwledge, DK The Punisher, Iman Omari, Chris Dave, J. LBS and more, as well as features from Anderson .Paak, his brother D Smoke, and Inglewood rapper, Fat Ron. The success of Seven Sundays on SoundCloud got the attention of Dave Free of Top Dawg Entertainment, who then reached out to Fresh Selects to connect him to SiR.

Through that initial introduction, SiR would go on to be featured on TDE artists, Jay Rock's 90059 song "The Ways", and Isaiah Rashad's "Rope / Rosegold" on The Sun's Tirade  On October 6, 2016, SiR released the EP titled HER which includes a feature on "Cadillac Dreams" from Big K.R.I.T. In January 2017, it was announced that SiR had signed to Top Dawg Entertainment. On February 10, 2017, he released his first EP on the label titled HER TOO with Anderson .Paak as a guest appearance.

On January 18, 2018, SiR released his sophomore album November.  This time out the album featured production from DJ Khalil, Mndsgn, Andre Harris, returning Seven Sundays collaborators DK The Punisher and J. LBS, and more.  The sole features on the project came by way of TDE label-mate ScHoolboy Q and British singer-songwriter Etta Bond.

2019–present: Chasing Summer 
On August 8, 2019, SiR announced his third album via TDE, releasing the first single off the album, "Hair Down" featuring Kendrick Lamar. Chasing Summer was released on August 30, 2019, and includes guest features from Kendrick Lamar, Lil Wayne, Jill Scott, Smino, Kadhja Bonet, Sabrina Claudio, and Zacari.

On February 3, 2020, SiR performed at NPR Tiny Desk Concert.  He devoted the performance to his infant godson who died a couple of days before. His set list included: "The Recipe", "New Sky", "Wires In The Sky", and "John Redcorn".

On April 23, 2020, as part of Top Dawg Entertainment's Fan Appreciation Week, SiR released the song Rapper Weed featuring Boogie. On April 27, he released the music video for the song "John Redcorn", which was inspired by the TV show, King of the Hill. In May 2022, He released "Satisfaction".

Discography

Studio albums

Extended plays

Mixtapes

Guest appearances

References 

1986 births
Living people
American rhythm and blues singers
American soul singers
Musicians from Inglewood, California
RCA Records artists
Record producers from California
Songwriters from California
Top Dawg Entertainment artists
21st-century American singers
American hip hop singers
American neo soul singers
Alternative R&B musicians